Ahafo are Akan people who live in Ghana.

References

Ethnic groups in Ghana